Dedi Indra Sampurna (born April 2, 1986), is an Indonesian professional footballer who currently plays for Gresik United in the Liga 3.

Club statistics

References

External links

1986 births
Association football defenders
Living people
Indonesian footballers
Liga 1 (Indonesia) players
Persela Lamongan players
Indonesian Premier Division players
Gresik United players
Persikab Bandung players